Heydarabad (also Romanized as Ḩeydarābād; also known as Heidar Abad Kahnooj, Ḩeydarābād-e Kahnūj, and Ḩeydarābād-e Soflá) is a village in Ganjabad Rural District, Esmaili District, Anbarabad County, Kerman Province, Iran. At the 2006 census, its population was 820, in 162 families.

References 

Populated places in Anbarabad County